Westray Airport  is an airport at Aikerness, on Westray in the Orkney Islands, Scotland. It is best known for being one of the two airports joined by the shortest scheduled flight in the world, a leg of Loganair's inter-island service to Papa Westray Airport. As well as the Papa Westray flights, services to the main Orkney town of Kirkwall are offered.

Westray Aerodrome has a CAA Ordinary Licence (Number P539) that allows flights for the public transport of passengers or for flying instruction as authorised by the licensee (Orkney Islands Council). It is also the start point for the European teams of the Greenland Air Trophy.  The aerodrome is not licensed for night use.

Westray Airport was previously known for having the shortest commercial runway in the world with runway 01/19 having a declared LDA distance of just 234 m. However this runway is no longer in use.

Airline and destinations

References

External links
 Overview of Westray Airport

Airports in Orkney
Westray